MDZ may refer to:

 MDZ Shield, a device on American school buses to prevent people from falling under the wheels
 Michael Del Zotto, ice hockey player for the Anaheim Ducks
 Munich Digitization Center of the Bavarian State Library, Germany
 Governor Francisco Gabrielli International Airport, Argentina, IATA code MDZ
 Taylor County Airport (Wisconsin), FAA code MDZ